Ayya is a 2005 Indian Kannada film directed by Om Prakash Rao, starring Darshan Thoogudeep and Rakshitha. Darshan plays the role of a brave police officer prepared to go to any lengths to control crime in the city. The background music and soundtrack have been scored by V. Ravichandran.
The director had revealed that he had copied scenes from ten movies including the Tamil movies Saamy and Madhurey.

Cast

Soundtrack

Box office
The film enjoyed box office success, with many cinemas running it for over 100 days.

Legacy
The dialogue "Naan convent alli odi police agiddalla. Corporation school alli odi police aagiddu" (Means, "I have not become a police officer by studying in the convent, I am a police officer who studied in corporation school"), became popular in Karnataka.

References

2005 films
2000s Kannada-language films
Films set in Bangalore
Indian action films
2005 action films
Fictional portrayals of the Karnataka Police
Films directed by Om Prakash Rao
Films scored by V. Ravichandran
Kannada remakes of Tamil films
Indian police films
2000s masala films